Równe  is a village located in Poland, in Opole Voivodeship, Głubczyce County, Gmina Głubczyce, near the border with the Czech Republic.

Notable residents
 Paul Zorner (1920–2014), Luftwaffe pilot

References

Villages in Głubczyce County